The canton of Dijon-3 is an administrative division of the Côte-d'Or department, eastern France. Its borders were modified at the French canton reorganisation which came into effect in March 2015. Its seat is in Dijon.

It consists of the following communes:
Dijon (partly)

References

Cantons of Côte-d'Or